Sung Yu-hsieh (born 5 March 1956) is a Taiwanese politician. He currently serves as the Deputy Secretary-General of the Executive Yuan since 13 August 2014.

Education
Sung obtained his bachelor's degree in applied mathematics from National Chung Hsing University in 1978 and master's degree in public policy from University of Michigan in the United States in 1982. He then obtained his doctoral degree in business administration from National Chengchi University in 1994.

References

Political office-holders in the Republic of China on Taiwan
Living people
1956 births
University of Michigan alumni
National Chengchi University alumni
National Chung Hsing University alumni